Hörschbach is a river of Baden-Württemberg, Germany. It flows into the Murr near Murrhardt.

See also
List of rivers of Baden-Württemberg

Rivers of Baden-Württemberg
Waterfalls of Germany
Rivers of Germany